Lechazo is a Spanish dish made from "cordero lechal".

Overview
The meat used is from unweaned lambs, and is similar to veal, or the meat of "cochinillo" (Spanish suckling pigs like tostón asado). The autonomous region of Castile and León has a distinctive version of lechazo referred to as "Lechazo de Castilla y Leon". It is one of the most important dishes of the cuisine of the province of Burgos. Aranda de Duero is known as the heart of the dish, with numerous restaurants that specialize in lechazo and feature "hornos de leña", or wooden stoves, in which the lamb is roasted.

The lamb used in lechal must derive all its nutrition from its mother's milk, and must be no more than 35 days old and weigh between 9 and 12 kilograms at the time of slaughter.

See also
 
 List of lamb dishes
 Spanish cuisine
 Castilian-Leonese cuisine
 Cuisine of the province of Valladolid

References

External links 
 Official Site of Aranda de Duero's 8th Gastronomic Competition of Roasted Lechazo
 https://web.archive.org/web/20081120124153/http://www.micordero.com/lechazo/index.html
 El Norte de Castilla - Lechazo de Castilla y León
 IGP Lechazo de Castilla y León

Spanish cuisine
Lamb dishes
National dishes